The Tsurumi Tsubasa Bridge is a cable-stayed bridge located at the western side of Yokohama Bay and is part of an expressway across the Port of Yokohama, Kanagawa prefecture in Japan.

See also
Transport in Japan
List of largest cable-stayed bridges
Yokohama Bay Bridge
Rainbow Bridge (Tokyo)

References

Bridges completed in 1994
Cable-stayed bridges in Japan
Buildings and structures in Yokohama
Transport in Yokohama
1994 establishments in Japan